Lawrence Barnes (born July 17, 1954) is a former American football running back who played three seasons in the National Football League (NFL) for the San Diego Chargers, St Louis Cardinals and Philadelphia Eagles.

Early life
Larry Barnes was born on July 17, 1954 in Bessemer, Alabama. He went to high school at Jess Lanier (AL).

Professional career

San Diego Chargers
Barnes was drafted in the 6th round (151st pick) of the 1977 NFL Draft by the San Diego Chargers. That year, he played in five total games and made 24 rushes for 70 yards. In 1978, he played in 4 games, before joining the St. Louis Cardinals.

St Louis Cardinals
The Cardinals cut running back Willie Shelby in order to make room to sign Barnes. He appeared in two games with the Cardinals before signing with the Philadelphia Eagles.

Philadelphia Eagles
With his third-team of the 1978 season, the Philadelphia Eagles, Barnes played in seven games, making just one rush attempt. His one attempt scored a touchdown. In 1979, he had his best season statistically, recording 25 rushes for 74 yards and a touchdown. He did not play in any other games following the 1979 season.

References

Living people
1954 births
American football running backs
Tennessee State Tigers football players
San Diego Chargers players
Philadelphia Eagles players
Arizona Cardinals players
Players of American football from Alabama
Sportspeople from Bessemer, Alabama
St. Louis Cardinals (football) players